Dundee Island is an ice-covered island lying east of the northeastern tip of Antarctic Peninsula and south of Joinville Island. It is named after the city of Dundee in Scotland.

The Petrel Base is a scientific station in Antarctica belonging to Argentina. Its coordinates are 63 ° 28′S 56 ° 17′W and it is located on rocks at 18 meters above sea level at the foot of the Rosamaría glacier in the Petrel bay, the low point of Cape Welchness on Dundee Island in the Joinville archipelago. A 10-year plan began in 2013 to convert it into a permanent base.

The base infrastructure has 3600 m² under roof, a 1200 m² logistics area and 25 beds. Account for transport: 2 Zodiac with outboard motor and 1 all-terrain truck of 1.5 ton.

It is from this island that the American businessman Lincoln Ellsworth, accompanied by the pilot Herbert Hollick-Kenyon, took off on the 23 November 1935 for the first crossing of the Antarctic by plane.

Nearby features 
The Eden Rocks, a designated Important Bird Area, lie off the east coast of Dundee Island. East past those are another rock, called Puget Rock. The use of "Puget" in this area commemorates Captain William D. Puget of the British Royal Navy. It was first used by Sir James Clark Ross on December 30, 1842, as "Cape Puget", but it is not clear from Ross' text what feature he was naming. The name Puget Rock was chosen by the United Kingdom Antarctic Place-Names Committee (UK-APC) in 1956 in order to preserve Ross' naming choice in the vicinity.

See also 
 Composite Antarctic Gazetteer
 List of Antarctic islands south of 60° S
 SCAR
 Territorial claims in Antarctica
 Active Reef

References

Islands of the Joinville Island group